Carl Lee Cranke (September 24, 1948 – November 14, 2020) was an American professional motorcycle enduro competitor. He represented the United States in 10 International Six Days Trial (ISDT) in the 1960s and 1970s. He earned seven gold medals and two silver medals in ISDT competitions to become one of the most accomplished American enduro riders of his era. Cranke was also notable for his two stroke engine tuning abilities, and was also credited with helping develop Penton motorcycles. He was inducted into the AMA Motorcycle Hall of Fame in 2000.


Motorcycle racing career
Cranke grew up in Northern California, near Sacramento where he attended Bella Vista High School in Fair Oaks, California. He began racing a 50cc Suzuki in local dirt track races with sponsorship from a local motorcycle shop when he was 16 years old. He also began racing in scrambles racing which was the forerunner to the sport of motocross. Cranke became a professional dirt track racer when he turned 18, competing against future dirt track national champions Mert Lawwill and Dick Mann. In 1968, he was the top ranked novice dirt track racer in the nation.

When dirt track racing became too expensive for him, Cranke began competing in Hare scrambles and Hare and Hound races. He also began competing in motocross racing against northern California racers such as future world champion Brad Lackey. After Cranke defeated Swedish rider Lars Larsson in the support race at a Trans-AMA motocross event in Gilroy, California, he was contracted to race for the Penton racing team. Pentons were off-road competition motorcycles primarily designed and sold in the United States by John Penton. Initial frame manufacturing and assembly were done by the KTM factory of Austria, which eventually took over all production and distribution in the United States.

Cranke qualified to become a member of the U.S. ISDT Team representing the United States at the 1972 International Six Days Trial in Czechoslovakia. The International Six Days Trial, now known as the International Six Days Enduro, is a form of off-road motorcycle Olympics which is the oldest annual competition sanctioned by the FIM dating back to 1913. He earned a Gold Medal that year in Czechoslovakia and, went on to represent the United States in 10 International Six Days Trials events while competing aboard Penton, KTM and Yamaha motorcycles. He earned a total of  seven gold medals and two silver medals in ISDT competition. Cranke ended his professional racing career after the 1981 season.

Later in life, Cranke lived in Battle Ground, Washington. He was inducted into the AMA Motorcycle Hall of Fame in 2000. At the age of 72, he died from cancer in Vancouver, Washington on November 14, 2020.

References

External links 
Carl Cranke at the Motorcycle Hall of Fame

1948 births
2020 deaths
People from Fair Oaks, California
Sportspeople from Sacramento County, California
People from Battle Ground, Washington
American motocross riders
Enduro riders
Off-road motorcycle racers
Deaths from cancer in Washington (state)
Place of birth missing